George Washington Colonials basketball may refer to either of the basketball teams that represent George Washington University:

George Washington Colonials men's basketball
George Washington Colonials women's basketball